Buzz is the third and final studio album by Alter Natives, released on August 4, 1989 by SST Records.

Track listing

Personnel 
Adapted from the Buzz liner notes.

Alter Natives
 Chris Bopst – bass guitar
 Greg Ottinger – guitar
 Jim Thomson – drums

Additional musicians'
 Steve Finberg – percussion
 Joseph J – vocals (5)
 Paul Watson – trumpet (1)

Production and design
 Alter Natives – production, engineering
 Fred German – cover art
 Adam Green – production, engineering
 John Morand – assistant engineer

Release history

References

External links 
 
 Buzz at Bandcamp

1989 albums
Alter Natives albums
SST Records albums